The Chuvash State Opera and Ballet Theater (() is an opera and ballet theater in Cheboksary, Chuvashia (Russia). Initially, it was known as the Chuvash Musical Theater, but was given its present name in 1993.

The yearly International Opera Festival named after Maxim Mikhailov held in the theater since 1991, the International Ballet Festival organized in 1997, the International Competition of Young Opera Singers named after Maxim Mikhailov held for the first time in 2010, and the Festival of Operetta organized in 2010 have become part of the cultural heritage of Chuvashia.

History 
The theater was opened in 1960 with the first opera being Water Mill by F. Vasilev. The founder and first director of the theater was Boris Markov.

Administration

Ballet 
The company has artists from Yoshkar-Ola, St. Petersburg and other cities.

See also
 Chuvash State Drama Theater
 Chuvash State Puppet Theater
 Chuvash State Symphony Capella

References
Notes

Sources, in Russian
 Заломнов, П. Д. "Марков Борис Семенович" // Заломнов, П. Д. Чувашский государственный театр оперы и балета и ведущие мастера его сцены / П. Д. Заломнов. – Чебоксары, 2002. – С. 25-26.
 Марков, А. С. "На театральных подмостках трагедии разыгрываются по-настоящему" / А. С. Марков // СЧ–Столица. – 2000. – 26 янв. – 1 февр. (№ 3). – С. 15.
 Алексеев, О. "Оперӑпа балет театрне – Борис Марков ятне" / О. Алексеев // Хыпар. – 2001. – 16 ҫу.
 Канюкова, А. С., "Жизнь, отданная театру"/ А. С. Канюкова, А. С. Марков. – Чебоксары : Изд-во ЧГУ, 1999. – 134 с. : ил.

External links
 Website of the Chuvash State Ballet & Opera Theatre

Music venues completed in 1960
Opera houses in Russia
Russian ballet
Theatres completed in 1960
Theatres in Chuvashia